Basil Dearden (born Basil Clive Dear; 1 January 1911 – 23 March 1971) was an English film director.

Early life and career
Dearden was born at 5, Woodfield Road, Leigh-on-Sea, Essex to Charles James Dear, a steel manufacturer, and his wife, Florence  Tripp.

Basil Dean
Dearden graduated from theatre direction to film, working as an assistant to Basil Dean. He later changed his own name to Dearden to avoid confusion with his mentor.

He wrote This Man Is News (1938), a hugely popular quota quickie and wrote and directed a film for TV Under Suspicion (1939).

He was assistant director on Penny Paradise (1938), produced by Dean and directed by Carol Reed, and two George Formby comedies directed by Anthony Kimmins: George Takes the Air (1938), produced by Dean, and Come on George! (1939).

Dearden was promoted to associate producer on two more George Formby films, which he also co-wrote: To Hell with Hitler (1940) aka Let George Do It and Spare a Copper (1940).

Dearden went over to Ealing Studios where he produced The Ghost of St. Michael's (1941) with Will Hay, then he produced Turned Out Nice Again (1941) with George Formby.

Director

Ealing Studios
He first began working as a director at Ealing Studios, co-directing comedy films with Will Hay, starting with Black Sheep of Whitehall (1942). This was followed by The Goose Steps Out (1942) and My Learned Friend (1943), which was Hay's last movie.

Dearden's first solo director credit was The Bells Go Down (1943), a wartime movie with Tommy Trinder. It was produced by Michael Relph who would form a notable collaboration with Dearden.

Dearden also directed The Halfway House (1944), a drama set in wales, and wrote and directed They Came to a City (1944), based on a play by J.B Priestley.

Dearden worked on the influential chiller compendium Dead of Night (1945) and directed the linking narrative and the "Hearse Driver" segment.

He also directed The Captive Heart (1946) starring Michael Redgrave, which was a big hit. The film was entered into the 1946 Cannes Film Festival.  He directed  Frieda (1947) with Mai Zetterling and produced by Relph, which was also popular.

Dearden directed Saraband for Dead Lovers (1948) an expensive costume picture that was not a large success. He wrote and directed a segment of Train of Events (1949).

The Blue Lamp (1950), probably the most frequently shown of Dearden's Ealing films, is a police drama which first introduced audiences to PC George Dixon, later resurrected for the long-running Dixon of Dock Green television series. It was hugely popular.

Less so were Cage of Gold (1950), a drama with Jean Simmons; Pool of London (1951), a crime film with a black lead, very rare for the time; and I Believe in You (1952), a drama which he also wrote and produced.

Dearden made The Gentle Gunman (1952), an IRA thriller with Dirk Bogarde; The Square Ring (1953), a boxing film with Jack Warner; The Rainbow Jacket (1954), a horse racing drama; and Out of the Clouds (1955), set at an airport.

He did a war film which he also wrote, The Ship That Died of Shame (1955) then a comedy with Benny Hill, Who Done It? (1956).

Dearden did some uncredited directing on The Green Man (1956) then made an Ealing style comedy for British Lion The Smallest Show on Earth (1957).

For Rank he made Violent Playground (1958) with Stanley Baker. He did some uncredited directing on one of Ealing's last films, Nowhere to Go (1958). He also produced Davy (1958), with Harry Secombe, for Ealing.

Social Justice Movies
Dearden and Michael Relph made a series of films on subjects generally not tackled by British cinema in this era starting with Sapphire (1959), a thriller about race relations that 
proved popular.

Dearden and Relph helped set up Allied Film Makers for whom they made The League of Gentlemen (1960), a cynical comedy that was very popular.

Dearden directed episodes of The Four Just Men on TV and produced two films directed by Michael Relph: Mad Little Island (1958) and Desert Mice (1959).

For Allied, Dearden directed Man in the Moon (1960), a science fiction comedy with Kenneth More that lost money. The Secret Partner (1961) was a thriller for MGM starring Stewart Granger.

Dearden directed Victim (1961) with Dirk Bogarde for Allied; a thriller about homosexuality, it was a huge success.

However, his next few movies were not popular: All Night Long (1961), an adaptation of Othello; Life for Ruth (1962), for Allied, which dealt with religious objections to operations.; A Place to Go (1964), for Bryanston Films, a thriller not released for two years; and  The Mind Benders (1963) a science fiction with Dirk Bogarde.

Later films
Dearden and Relph then made two films for release by United Artists:  Woman of Straw (1964) starring Sean Connery; and Masquerade (1965) with Cliff Robertson. He was then hired to replace Lewis Gilbert as director of Khartoum (1966), with Charlton Heston and Laurence Olivier.

Two films were then made for release by Paramount: Only When I Larf (1968) and the Edwardian era black comedy The Assassination Bureau (1969), again with Michael Relph; it was the 25th film they had made together.

His last film was The Man Who Haunted Himself (1970), which he wrote and directed, starring Roger Moore, made for EMI Films. With Moore, Dearden made three episodes of the television series The Persuaders!: Overture, Powerswitch and To the Death, Baby.

He had two sons, Torquil Dearden and the screenwriter and director James Dearden.

Death
Dearden died on 23 March 1971 at Hillingdon Hospital, London after being involved in a road accident on the M4 motorway near Heathrow Airport, in which he suffered multiple injuries. His death was coincidentally foreshadowed in his final film, which opens with a sequence in which Roger Moore's character almost dies in a car accident after driving recklessly at high speed along the M4.

Reputation
The film critic David Thomson does not hold Dearden in high regard. He writes: "Dearden's films are decent, empty and plodding and his association with Michael Relph is a fair representative of the British preference for bureaucratic cinema. It stands for the underlining of obvious meaning".

More positively, for Brian McFarlane, the Australian writer on film: "Dearden's films offer, among other rewards, a fascinating barometer of public taste at its most nearly consensual over three decades".

Regular Ealing cinematographer Douglas Slocombe enjoyed working with Dearden personally, describing him as the 'most competent' of the directors he worked with at Ealing.

Filmography

References

External links

Criterion Collection Essay
Film Reference biography
Screenonline biography
Fandango filmography

1911 births
1971 deaths
English film directors
English film producers
English male screenwriters
English television directors
People from Westcliff-on-Sea
Road incident deaths in London
20th-century English screenwriters
20th-century English male writers
20th-century English businesspeople